Njan Salperu Ramankutty is a 2004 Indian Malayalam language film directed by Anil Babu and starring [[Nandish Krishna Kumar
]] and Gayatri Jayaraman.

Plot
Ramankutty (Jayaram), a teacher in the village school is known as "salperu" (i.e. good reputation). Ramankutty's uncles- Narayanan, Madhavan, Velayudhan and Shankaran
are in a competition to get Ramankutty to marry their respective daughters. Ramankutty agrees to marry his uncle Velayudhan's daughter. Madhavan's daughter Sangeetha  arrives from Mumbai and seeing her, Ramankutty changes his mind. On the eve of the marriage Ramankutty's reputation is shattered. Life becomes hell.

Cast
Jayaram... Ramankutty
Gayatri Jayaraman… Sangeetha
Janardanan… Narayanan
Jagathi Sreekumar... Madhavan
Lalu Alex… Velayudhan
Maniyanpilla Raju… Sankaran
Kaviyoor Ponnamma aa Ramankutty's Mother
Karthika
Urmila Unni
Suja Karthika as Ramankutty's sister 
Boban Alummoodan
Nirosha… Dakshayani
Paravoor Bharathan… Kunjambu
Kottayam Nazir… Himself
Mala Aravindan… Qadir
Thesni Khan...as Ramankutty's younger sister
Binda

References

2004 films
2000s Malayalam-language films
Films scored by Raveendran